Nunda Township is located in McHenry County, Illinois. As of the 2010 census, its population was 38,245 and it contained 14,492 housing units. Nunda Township changed its name from Brooklyn Township on December 28, 1850. Nunda Township shares the distinction with McHenry Township as being the two largest townships by land area in McHenry County, at  each.

Nunda is pronounced locally NUN-duh.

Geography

Demographics

References

External links
City-data.com
Illinois State Archives

Townships in McHenry County, Illinois
Townships in Illinois